Ahmed Cherkaoui (2 October 1934 - 17 August 1967) was a Moroccan painter who worked in oil, gouache, and watercolour.

Education 
Born in Boujad, Cherkaoui studied at the École des métiers d'art and the École des Beaux-Arts in Paris, winning a scholarship in 1961 to the School of Fine Arts in Warsaw.

Works 
He was influenced by Western artists including Paul Klee, Roger Bissière, and Henri Matisse and by traditional Moroccan art which he studied with support from UNESCO. He began exhibiting in 1959. His style was abstract but used motifs from Moroccan tattoos, pottery, leatherwork, weaving, ornaments, and architecture. Until 1965 his paintings had combinations of dark colours; from that point on his style was more light and spacious. From 1966 he applied his style to leather as a medium.

Death and legacy 
He died 17 August 1967 in Casablanca after a routine operation. Posthumous exhibitions of his art were held in Paris and in Rabat.

References

Further reading 
 
 
 

20th-century Moroccan artists
1934 births
1967 deaths
People from Boujad